"Hit 'Em Up Style (Oops!)" is the debut single of American R&B singer Blu Cantrell, written and produced by Dallas Austin and featured on Cantrell's debut album, So Blu (2001). The song was released in the United States on April 23, 2001, and was issued in other regions later that year. It is Cantrell's most successful single in the US and her only single to enter the top 40 of the Billboard Hot 100, peaking at number two (where it spent two consecutive weeks) on the issue date of July 21, 2001. It enjoyed similar success in Europe and Oceania.

Composition
The lyrics propose that women should take revenge on cheating men by draining them of their available assets, both monetary assets and property. Cantrell has said that she did not particularly care for the song artistically, but the bitter feelings she was experiencing at the time led her to include it on the album anyway. "Hit 'Em Up Style (Oops!)" takes a small snippet sample from Frank Sinatra’s "Boys' Night Out". The song is written in the key of F minor and is written in half time with a tempo of 90 beats per minute.  The song features the chords Fm and Bm6, and Cantrell's vocals span from B3 to A5.

Track listings

US CD single
 "Hit 'Em Up Style (Oops!)" (radio mix) – 4:02
 "Hit 'Em Up Style (Oops!)" (instrumental) – 4:12
 Snippets from So Blu
 "Till I'm Gone" – 1:01
 "I'll Find a Way" – 1:03
 "The One" – 1:09
 "U Must B Crazy" – 0:59
 "Waste My Time" (featuring L.O.) – 1:08

European CD single
 "Hit 'Em Up Style (Oops!)" (radio mix) – 4:02
 "Hit 'Em Up Style (Oops!)" (remix featuring Foxy Brown) – 3:34
 "Hit 'Em Up Style (Oops!)" (remix featuring Jazze Pha and L.O.) – 4:36

European 12-inch single
A1. "Hit 'Em Up Style (Oops!)" (radio mix)
B1. "Hit 'Em Up Style (Oops!)" (remix)
B2. "Hit 'Em Up Style (Oops!)" (instrumental)

UK cassette single
 "Hit 'Em Up Style (Oops!)" (radio mix) – 4:02
 "Hit 'Em Up Style (Oops!)" (remix featuring Foxy Brown) – 3:34

Australian maxi-CD single
 "Hit 'Em Up Style (Oops!)" (album version radio edit) – 4:02
 "Hit 'Em Up Style (Oops!)" (remix featuring Foxy Brown) – 4:12
 "Hit 'Em Up Style (Oops!)" (remix featuring Jazze Pha and L.O.) – 4:38
 "Hit 'Em Up Style (Oops!)" (album version instrumental) – 4:12

Credits and personnel
Credits are adapted from the US CD single liner notes.

Studios
 Recorded at D.A.R.P. Studios (Atlanta, Georgia)
 Mixed at Larrabee North Studios (Hollywood, California)

Personnel

 Blu Cantrell – vocals, background vocals
 Dallas Austin – writing, keyboard, bass, production
 Kimberly Smith – production coordination
 Carlton Lynn – recording
 Doug Harms – recording assistant
 Kevin "KD" Davis – mixing
 Rick Sheppard – MIDI and sound design

 Antonio "LA" Reid – executive production
 C. "Tricky" Stewart – executive production
 Tab Nkhereanye – co-executive production
 TAB – A&R director
 Liz Garner – A&R coordinator
 gravillis inc. – design
 Kwaku Alston – photography

Charts

Weekly charts

Year-end charts

Certifications

Release history

References

2000 songs
2001 debut singles
Arista Records singles
Blu Cantrell songs
Hip hop soul songs
Music videos directed by Wayne Isham
Song recordings produced by Dallas Austin
Songs about infidelity
Songs with feminist themes
Songs written by Dallas Austin